The first season of Australian reality television series House Rules, also known as House Rules 2013, was commissioned in 2012 and began airing on 14 May 2013. The series is produced by the team who created the Seven reality show My Kitchen Rules and is hosted by Johanna Griggs.

House Rules places six teams renovating each other's homes and further challenges for the ultimate prize of a full mortgage payment.

Contestant Teams

This season of House Rules introduced six new teams. All teams are from different states in Australia.

Elimination history

Competition Details

Phase 1: Interior Renovation
For the interior renovation round, all 6 teams had their homes transformed by each other through a rotation round format over a course of 6 weeks. At the end of each renovation, the highest scoring team received an advantage for the next renovation, and lowest scoring receiving a disadvantage. At the end, all scores were tallied up and the team with lowest overall total was eliminated from the competition.

Western Australia: Jemma & Ben
 Episodes 1 to 4
 Airdate — 14 to 20 May 2013
 Description — Teams head to the first renovation at Jemma & Ben's 1950s home in Perth, Western Australia.

Tasmania: Jane & Plinio
 Episodes 5 to 8
 Airdate — 21 to 27 May 2013
 Description — Teams head off to the second renovation at Jane & Plinio's 1930s home in Hobart, Tasmania. Two bedrooms belong to their children Jarra, 16 years old & Nina, eight years old.
Previous winner's advantage: Carly & Leighton — They got to decide on which zone they wanted to renovate
Previous loser's disadvantage: Amy & Sean — Camping in the back yard in a tent during the renovation.

Victoria: Nick & Chris
 Episodes 9 to 12
 Airdate — 28 May to 3 June 2013
 Description — Teams travel to Nick & Chris's 1970s home in Melbourne, Victoria for the third renovation. 
Previous winner's advantage: Amy & Sean — They got to decide on which zone they wanted to renovate
Previous loser's disadvantage: Jemma & Ben — Camping in the back yard in a tent during the renovation.

South Australia: Carly & Leighton
 Episodes 13 to 16
 Airdate — 4 to 10 June 2013
 Description — Teams head to Carly & Leighton's 1950s home in Adelaide, South Australia for the fourth renovation. 
Previous winner's advantage: Jemma & Ben — They got to decide on which zone they wanted to renovate
Previous loser's disadvantage: Michelle & Steve — Although Carly & Leighton were the lowest scoring team in the previous week, they do not participate in the renovation of their own home and because Jemma and Ben got the highest score they got to choose who went into the tent and they chose Michelle and Steve.

Queensland: Amy & Sean
 Episodes 17 to 20
 Airdate — 11 to 17 June 2013
 Description — Teams travel to Brisbane, Queensland to renovate Amy & Sean's 1950s home for the fifth renovation. 
Previous winner's advantage: Jemma & Ben — They got to decide on which zone they wanted to renovate
Previous loser's disadvantage: Jane & Plinio — Camping in the back yard in a tent during the renovation.

New South Wales: Michelle & Steve
 Episodes 21 to 24
 Airdate — 18 to 24 June 2013
 Description — Teams travel to Sydney, New South Wales to renovate Michelle & Steve's 1950s family home in the sixth and final interior renovation. Two bedrooms belong to their children; daughter Alex, 20 years old & son Jesse, 18 years old. The lowest scoring team overall will be eliminated.
Previous winner's advantage: None - Michelle & Steve came first in the last renovation, but due to this renovation being their home they are not involved in the renovation, therefore there is no winner advantage.
Previous loser's disadvantage: Nick & Chris — Camping in the back yard in a tent during the renovation.

Phase 2: 24 Hour Fix-Up

 Episode 25
 Airdate — 25 June 2013
 Description — Each team returned to their own home and had to re-invent one of the zones in 24 hours. Teams must stick to a budget of $5000 and must stay together at all times. The lowest scoring team will be eliminated.

Phase 3: Gardens and Exteriors

The top 4 teams are challenged to transform the exteriors and gardens of each other's homes. Two teams are allocated to a home (that does not belong to them) and must renovate either the front or back yards, as well as improving the house exterior. For each house, the owners also left an exclusive item that must be used in the zone. The semifinals are held over two rounds and after both rounds are complete, the two lowest scoring team are eliminated.

Round 1

 Episode 26
 Airdate —  26 & 27 June 2013
 Description — In round 1 of the exterior renovations, the 4 remaining teams head to Sydney and Adelaide to transform the gardens and house exterior in 3 and a half days. Teams are allocated to the front or back yard of either Michelle & Steve's or Carly & Leighton's house.

Round 2

 Episodes 27
 Airdate —  30 June 2013
 Description — The teams continue on to round 2 of the exterior renovations in Perth and Melbourne to transform the gardens and house exterior in 3 and a half days. Teams are allocated to the front or back yard of either Jemma & Ben's or Nick & Chris' house. At the end of this round, the two lowest scoring teams will be eliminated.

 Note:
  - The exterior garden renovations were judged by landscape designer, Jim Fogarty along with Wendy Moore.

Grand Final: Final Renovation and Australia's Vote

 Episode 28
 Airdate — 1 July 2013
 Description — The final two teams completed one final challenge at their opponent's home, renovating a spare/secret room as a blank canvas, though they were not scored on these rooms. The Australian public voted for their favourite team to win. The winner was decided by the public votes.

Ratings

 Colour key:
  – Highest rating during the season
  – Lowest rating during the season

Ratings data used is from OzTAM and represents the live and same day average viewership from the 5 largest Australian metropolitan centres (Sydney, Melbourne, Brisbane, Perth and Adelaide).

Notes
Melbourne, Adelaide & Perth only
Sydney & Brisbane only

References

2013 Australian television seasons